The Friedrichshafen FF.4 was a seaplane built in Germany in the early 1910s.

Specifications (FF.4)

References

Bibliography

Further reading

Friedrichshafen aircraft
Floatplanes